The Gugunian Expedition was an attempt by a small group of Armenian nationalists from the Russian Empire to launch an armed expedition across the border into the Ottoman Empire in 1890 in support of local Armenians.

Background 

The Armenian Revolutionary Federation was the Armenian organization of Armenian national movement active in the region. The leader of the expedition was a former student, Sarkis Gugunian (1866–1913). Like many other Russian Armenians, he was concerned with the fate of Ottoman Armenians living under the rule of the Sultan Abdul Hamid II. Initially, Gugunian had the backing of the leading Armenian nationalist party in Russia, the Dashnaks, but they soon tried to dissuade him from embarking on such an unrealistic scheme.

With financial support from wealthy Armenians living in Tbilisi and Baku, Gugunian was able to buy weapons and raise a volunteer force of 125 men.

Conflict 
Gugunian went ahead with his expedition and his volunteer force set off on September 27, 1890. They crossed the border but ran low on food supplies and after a clash with Turkish and Kurdish troops, they retreated to Russia. Here they were intercepted by Cossacks who arrested 43 members of the expedition. The Russian authorities treated any Armenian nationalist activity within their empire with deep suspicion and the arrested members were put on trial. They had fought under a banner with the initials "M.H.", which could stand for either "Mother Armenia" or "Union of Patriots" in Armenian. The prosecutor at the trial, which took place in Kars in 1892, alleged that the letters meant "United Armenia", another possible – and more subversive – interpretation. 27 of the accused were convicted and exiled to Siberia.

Aftermath 
Although the expedition was a failure, its members became heroes of the Armenian nationalist cause and the subject of patriotic songs.

Sources

1890 in the Ottoman Empire
1890 in the Russian Empire
19th century in Armenia